Lamacha is a monotypic genus of snout moths. It was described by Francis Walker in 1863 and contains the species Lamacha bilineolata. It is found in China.

References

External links
 

Pyralinae
Monotypic moth genera
Moths of Asia
Pyralidae genera